A.K. Moorthy is Indian politician who was a Deputy General Secretary of PMK, Former Member of parliament, Lok Sabha, Former Union Minister of State for Railways in Atal Bihari led NDA government.

He was born 12 July 1964 at Kilmambattu a remote village in Gingee Taluk, in Tamil Nadu in an agriculturalist family. He did his schooling in the said village and later acquired MA. in Sociology from Annamalai University. He moved on to Chennai and started his own business.

At this stage, he came in contact with PMK Founder S. Ramadoss, attracted by the policies and activities of the Party. He started his political career as an ordinary party member and rose in the party hierarchy to the level of Deputy General Secretary of the PMK Party. He contested the Chengalpattu Lok Sabha Constituency for the first time in 1999, won with a handsome margin and got elected to the 13th Lok Sabha.

Shri A.K.Moorthy was inducted to the Union Council of Ministers as a Minister of State for Railways on 1 July 2002. He assumed charge as Minister of State for Railways on 2 July 2002. Shri Moorthy, Minister of state for Railways has visited 152 Railway Stations spread around the Northern Railway, Central Railway, Western Railway, Eastern railway, South Central Railway, and Southern Railway during his tenure as a Union Minister.

He often witnessed the uncomfortable journey of the mothers to make their babies sleep on boards. The Minister took Pity on their plight and gave a serious thought to solve this problem. As a result, he introduced the cradle service system ( Thottil Kuzhanthai Thittam ) for the first time in the history of Indian railways on 20 September 2002. This service has been widely acclaimed by the passengers, particularly women.

A.K. Moorthy during his tenure introduced many trains for people which benefited the country. Special appreciation was also given by former Prime Minister of India Shri Atal Bihari Vajpayee and former President of India Shri A. P. J. Abdul Kalam.

A.K. Moorthy for the second time contested the Chengalpattu Lok Sabha Constituency in 2004, won with a very huge margin and got elected to the 14th Lok Sabha. He served the people of Chengalpattu Lok Sabha Constituency as a representative for 10 years in the Parliament of India. Mr. Moorthy was also a Member of Parliamentary Standing Committee: On Chemical And Fertilizer, On Rural Development, On Public Grievances, Law and Justice. He actively participated in the deliberations of these committees and voiced for the poor and downtrodden. Shri Moorthy as a young and a dynamic Member of Parliament, concentrated on primary education, public distribution system, rural transport.

Positions Held

References

External links
 Members of Fourteenth Lok Sabha - Parliament of India website
 Official biographical sketch in Parliament of India website

Living people
Indian Tamil people
Lok Sabha members from Tamil Nadu
1964 births
India MPs 2004–2009
Pattali Makkal Katchi politicians
India MPs 1999–2004
National Democratic Alliance candidates in the 2014 Indian general election
People from Viluppuram district
People from Kanchipuram district